Scopula benitaria is a moth of the family Geometridae first described by William Barnes and James Halliday McDunnough in 1913. It is found in North America, including New Mexico and Texas.

References

Moths described in 1913
benitaria
Moths of North America